Paul Chambers (1935–1969) was an American jazz bassist.

Paul Chambers may also refer to:

 Sir Paul Chambers (industrialist) (1904–1981), British civil servant, industrialist, and chairman of ICI
 Paul Chambers (footballer) (born 1982), Australian rules footballer
 Paul Chambers (Paralympian), New Zealand Paralympic athlete
 Paul Chambers, involved in the legal case R v. Paul Chambers, better known as the Twitter Joke Trial
  (1868–1930), British architect who worked in Argentina